Leejung Lee (born August 9, 1998) is a South Korean choreographer and dancer as part of NWX, a dance division of YGX. Leejung steadily gained recognition as the youngest and first female recruit through auditions for the world-class dance crew, Just Jerk, and propelled to domestic stardom as a dancer and choreographer following her appearance on Street Woman Fighter (2021).

Life and career

1998–2014: Early life 
Lee Leejung was born on August 9, 1998, in Seoul, South Korea. She is the daughter of Lee Sang-mok and has an older brother. Since childhood, Leejung discovered her athletic abilities from first grade of elementary school after she learned to swim. Despite training for six consecutive years, Leejung stopped as she felt her skills weren't on par to an athlete after she deemed her co-peers "excessively good". Besides swimming, she trained in skiing and speed skating for one and two years respectively. Leejung also enjoyed dancing to performances that appeared on the television including "Into the New World" by Girls' Generation and "Tell Me" by Wonder Girls, whom she cited as artists from her generation. In the midst of third grade of elementary school, Leejung participated in a talent show held by her school with "Tell Me". In this moment, she believed she was "born to dance" and recalled it as the first time she felt joy while dancing.

Her parents, however, believed dancing would serve as a distraction to her studies and were adamant on sending her abroad. Leejung was raised Christian and attended The King's Academy in Tennessee, United States for 4–5 years during sixth grade of elementary to end of middle school. Amidst her stay, her parents humorously proposed if she became the top student in her school, they'd allow her to receive dance lessons in South Korea during summer vacation. That same year, Leejung placed first in her entire school and was said to have an IQ of 150. Although they were rendered speechless, her parents allowed her to receive two months of lessons at age 16, her first formal experience to learn the art of dance. With plans set to return to US, Leejung had a change of heart and no longer wished to return.

While crying in the subway, she told her mother: "I think I'll be miserable If I return to the states". Her father yielded to her aspirations with an ultimatum, if she didn't show any result within the dance scenes within a year, she'll depart back to the states. Determined to pursue her dreams, 17-year-old Leejung auditioned to join the South Korean dance crew, Just Jerk Crew—whom she cited as the nation's top dance crew—during their first open recruitment. To this, she recalled: "I thought they'd never have an audition. So, when I heard they were having one, I thought I'd be so happy to dance with these guys". In October 2014, she was recruited as the first and only female addition to the crew and served as their youngest member until Kwak Yoon-young, their second female member, joined the following year through their second round of recruitments.

2015–present: Career beginnings, rising popularity and breakthrough 

In the time Leejung spent as part of Just Jerk, she participated in multiple dance competitions and also served as one of their interpreter for English while abroad. Leejung received her first win at the 2016 Feedback 2Show  under the duet category. That same year, Just Jerk placed first at the 2016 Body Rock Dance Competition in San Diego, California. As the sole representative of South Korea, they were the first from their country to win the title in its history. The achievement brought them wider recognition via YouTube with their performance spreading from word-of-mouth both at home and abroad. The video soon reached the attention of the production team behind America's Got Talent. Just Jerk received an invitation via phone call from the casting director to appear on the twelfth installation of their show that was scheduled for broadcast in 2017. With only a year of preparation, Leejung and her team salvaged and earned money for plane tickets, accommodation for one month, car rentals, and meals.

In its auditions Leejung and her crew were unanimously passed by all four judges, however, they failed to enter the finals and were eliminated in the quarter-finals. Their final stage became the team's most viewed performance, which was represented in Silla's Hwarang-style make-up and outfits. Their appearance on the show created a growth in views to their videos from the 2016 Body Rock Dance Competition. The crew were awarded "AAA Choice" at the 2017 Asia Artist Awards and were noticed by the organizers of the 2018 Pyeongchang Winter Olympics. They were formally invited to participate in the opening ceremony as performers. Together with Leejung, Just Jerk also placed runner-up at the 2019 Feedback Competition 7. Although she departed from her team shortly after, they still maintain a tight bond and express support and respect. Leejung still frequented the academy as a guest instructor and mentored their fourth generation recruit, Jo Na-in.

Leejung joined YGX Entertainment in 2019 under NWX, a choreographer division of the dance agency. Although her first work as a choreographer was a joint project with Kwak Yoon-young, Leejung's career advanced following her first solo work with "Fancy" by Twice. Her most notable work, the "shoulder dance" routine for "Wannabe" by Itzy became its point dance and was spread across the nation. Her credits include choreographing for Sunmi, Twice, (G)I-dle, Itzy, Jeon Somi and more. Leejung was also scouted to take on the role of a dance trainer for Nayeon and Momo of Twice, Rosé of Blackpink and Jeon Somi by their respective agencies.

In 2021, she received a casting offer via DM (Direct Message) from the casting director of Street Woman Fighter (2021).  Without hesitation, she replied "yes" to their proposal. The head of her agency, however, advised instead of deciding on impulse, Leejung should have rationally pondered ahead of finalizing her decision. In the first meeting, she was told to recruit dancers and create a team. Hearing this, Leejung had four dancers in mind: "[...] I only gathered the people I wanted. Yeojin, who is small but dances with power has a lot in common with me. Jihyo's sexy and elegant dance, Isak's cool moves using her tall height and limbs, and B-girl Yell who not only breakdances but overall dances well. Each person was different, but it felt like we could work together. I thought it had to be us five." To her content, all four were interested and soon formed the project crew "YGX" with Leejung as its leader. She led her team to the semi-finals and finished the show in fifth place. Leejung reprised her role in Street Dance Girls Fighter (2021) as a "dance master" representing YGX. With Turns, her team finished the competition in first place.

Public image 

Leejung was well known within the dance scenes since her adolescent days due to her affiliations with the Just Jerk Crew. As the only female in the then-male dominated crew, she was put in the spotlight for her age, skills and gender and became a well-known figure for Generation MZ. Her line: "what did you do when you were 24 years old?" from Street Woman Fighter (2021) became viral and was perpetuated by celebrities and the general public. Despite its popularlity, Leejung confessed she regretted saying it and posted "everyone's twenty-four is precious". Leejung elaborated she spoke it in the heat of the competition to avoid any misunderstandings. Many identifies Leejung by her signature "Pucca" hairstyle, lip ring and red lipstick and is often portrayed using these trademarks when re-enacting her, namely seen by Taeyeon of Girls' Generation, comedian Jo Se-ho and Aiki of Hook. Leejung is often referred to as "baby tiger", where she embodies complete seriousness when dancing in contrast to her often seen cheerfulness. Her work with various people resulted in Leejung being often cited as a "trendy choreographer".

Artistry

Influence 
Leejung cited her parents as to what created who she was today as an individual, referring to her father's perseverance and her mother's tenderness and delicacy. Her father's work ethics of loving his job has also influenced Leejung to love and enjoy her work.

Other ventures

Endorsements 
Leejung with the members of YGX—which include Yeojin, Jihyo, Isak and Yell—filmed promotional videos for the campaign "Unstoppable Joy" (2021) in collaboration with BMW Korea. Fashion shopping app Brandi announced, after the launch of its "One Day Delivery" campaign with YGX in November 2021, the amount of transaction had grown 130% compared to the previous month. The number of app downloads also increased by 170% compared to the same period of last year. Together with YGX, Leejung further collaborated with contemporary casual brand Plac and endorsed for Nike Korea's "Own the Floor" campaign, IM Bank of DGB Financial Group, and Intel Korea.

Leejung's first individual endorsement stemmed from "Descente Ground Main" by Descente Korea in 2017 alongside the female dancers of Just Jerk. With her appearance on Street Woman Fighter (2021), Leejung's brand value rose and was often sought out by the advertising industry. She endorsed for oral hygiene brand Toosty, Paris Baguette, Nike X Peaceminusone's Kwondo 1, TikTok Korea with Mino of Winner and Part-timer Heaven alongside Jeon Somi.

Choreography credits

Filmography

Television shows

Music video appearances

Tours

Concert participation 

 Street Woman Fighter [On the Stage] (2021–2022)

Awards and nominations

Notes

References

External links 
 

1998 births
Living people
21st-century dancers
Women choreographers
People from Seoul
South Korean choreographers